Henry Neufeld (March 1923 – December 1986), was an internationally prominent Israeli cardiologist and scholar. His research and teaching interests included cardiology, epidemiology, genetics and biomedical engineering.  He served as chief scientist of the Israel Ministry of Health and was the founder and director of the Cardiac Clinic at Sheba Hospital in Tel Hashomer.

Born in Lwowek, Poland on March 13, 1923, Neufeld received his Doctor of Medicine degree at the University of Vienna in 1948 and completed his residency training there in 1951. From 1951 to 1959 he served as a cardiologist at The Chaim Sheba Medical Center in Tel Aviv. After serving two years in the United States, as a Special Appointee at the Mayo Clinic in Rochester, Minnesota and an Honorary Fellow at the University of Minnesota, Neufeld returned to The Chaim Sheba Medical Center to direct the new Heart Institute. He was Chief Scientist, Ministry of Health, Israel (1962), Professor of Medicine, Tel Aviv University Medical School and Professor of Cardiology, Chaim Sheba Chair of Cardiology, Tel Aviv University Medical School. He chaired a number of major committees of the Tel Aviv University Medical School and Tel Aviv University Senate. He held the title of Distinguished Professor of Cardiology, Chaim Sheba Extraordinary Chair of Cardiology, Sackler School of Medicine, Tel Aviv University.

Neufeld made extraordinarily wide contributions as a member of various heart associations and heart societies. He was President of the Israel Heart Association. He was President of the Asian-Pacific Society of Cardiology, President and President-Elect of the International Society and Federation of Cardiology and also President and Founder of the International Society of Cardiovascular Pharmacotherapy. His services included two terms as Chairman of the Board of Governors of the USA-Israeli Bi-National Science Foundation, and he was Vice-Chairman of the Council of Clinical Cardiology of the International Society and Federation of Cardiology. He was a member of numerous committees of the World Health Organization, including the WHO Task Force against Heart Disease and the WHO Task Force of Cardiovascular Emergencies. Neufeld was also chosen as a life member of the Israeli Academy of Sciences and Humanities in 1984, and in 1985 he received the Israel Prize for Medicine.

He was an Honorary Member of cardiac associations in Mexico, Portugal, Australia and New Zealand, Germany and Britain, as well as an Honorary Fellow of the Council of Clinical Cardiology, American Heart Association, and held an Honorary Citation for International Achievement, American Heart Association. He published over 400 articles in major cardiology journals, 10 books and 22 book chapters. Neufeld received worldwide recognition for his work.

To honor Neufeld's memory, the BSF established in 1987 the Neufeld Memorial Research Award to be given to the most outstanding and original new project in the health sciences. The grant is awarded annually and given to the investigators whose project is considered as the most outstanding and original.

Sources 
 DOI.org
 DOI.org
 https://web.archive.org/web/20071108045711/http://www.hmc-ims.com/125/%26action%3DsidLink%26stId%3D396
 https://web.archive.org/web/20090506054707/http://www.tasmc.org.il/e/84/1473.htm *http://www.cardiologyinreview.com/pt/re/cardiorev/abstract.00043605-199701000-00015.htm;jsessionid=JVcdvLbt911f4y1nTkMsbvMxjHwB7h4tynhlyGFPJn2G6hGpwJfG!-2118404334!181195629!8091!-1?nav=reference
 http://www.bsf.org.il/BSFPublic/DefaultPage1.aspx?PageId=32&innerTextID=32

Israeli cardiologists
1923 births
1986 deaths
People from Nowy Tomyśl County
Polish expatriates in Austria
Polish emigrants to Israel
Israeli expatriates in the United States